Oughtred, also spelt Ughtred and Outred (pronounced "oo-tred"), is a surname and given name of Anglo-Saxon English origin meaning "son of Uhtred". It is derived from the old English Ūhtrǣd composed of the elements uht “dusk, twighlight” and ræd “advice”. It may refer to the following people:
Given name
Uhtred of Bamburgh (died 1016), Anglo-Saxon warlord
Ughtred Kay-Shuttleworth (1844-1939), English landowner and politician

Surname
Anthony Ughtred (c. 1478–1534), English soldier and military administrator
 Bernard Oughtred (1880–1949), English rugby union player
 Elizabeth Oughtred (1518–1568), English baroness, wife of Anthony Ughtred
Evelyne Oughtred Buchanan (1883–1979), British artist
Henry Ughtred (c. 1533–1598), English Member of Parliament, shipowner and shipbuilder
 Natasha Oughtred, English ballerina
Thomas Ughtred, 1st Baron Ughtred (1292–c.1365), English soldier and politician
 William Oughtred (1574–1660), English mathematician and Anglican clergyman

References

English-language surnames